Praskovia ”Pasha” Pozdniakova (born 15 April 1999) is a Finnish-Russian model, entrepreneur and social media influencer. She performs under the stage name MissParaskeva. She especially known for her appearance in the 2021 South African edition of Playboy magazine.

Pozdniakova lived in Russia until she was 13, after which the family moved to Finland and settled in the town of Savonlinna, and in 2020 Pozdniakova and her family received Finnish citizenship. Pozdniakova moved to Helsinki in 2020, but in 2022 she returned to Savonlinna, where she lives today.

Pozdniakova started her social media career in high school by making YouTube videos. In January 2021, her Instagram account had more than 1 million followers. Pozdniakova also makes content for TikTok and Twitch.

Pozdniakova has spoken in public in favor of body positivity, and said that she thinks all kinds of women are beautiful. Although she often appears in scantily clad pictures, she has said that she dresses conservatively in her spare time and does not want to be seen as an erotic model.

Seiska reported in 2022 that the American rapper A$AP Rocky had tried to seduce Pozdniakova before ending up together with the singer Rihanna. Pozdniakova ended up dating Finnish rapper Gettomasa.

References

External links

Pasha Pozdniakova on YouTube

1999 births
2020s Playboy Playmates
Finnish female models
Finnish people of Russian descent
Living people
People from Saint Petersburg
People from Savonlinna